Clever Group (formerly Clever Media Network) is one of the largest players in the Romanian media market, its complete portfolio includes 17 TV channels (Prima TV, Prima Sport 1, Prima Sport 2, Prima Sport 3, Prima Sport 4, Prima Sport 5, Prima Sport PPV 1, Prima Sport PPV 2, Prima Sport PPV 3, Prima Sport PPV 4, Prima News, Prima Comedy, Prima 4K, Profit News, Agro TV, Cinemaraton, Medika TV) and 9 sites (servuscluj.ro, looksport.ro, medicatv.ro, agro-tv.ro. Profit.ro, primatv.ro, focusprimatv. ro, primaplay.ro, cinemaraton.ro).

The company was awarded in 2018 with the first place in the Top Business Romania 2018.

Since November 2020, Clever Media Network has changed its name to Clever Group.

The Clever Group operates through its companies, CleverMedia Network, Clever Business Transylvania and Diplomatic Digital.

References

External links
 

Television channels and stations established in 2011
2011 establishments in Romania